Cottesmore is a preparatory school in the United Kingdom, founded in 1894. It is full boarding.

History
Cottesmore was founded by Geoffrey Davison Brown in 1894 in Hove, East Sussex. He named the school after Cottesmore, Rutland, where he was born. The new buildings for the preparatory school were officially opened on 19 June 1897. Davison Brown served as headmaster until his death in 1929, aged 60.

In 1940 the school was evacuated from the south coast of England, to Wales, initially to the Oakeley Arms Hotel, Tan-y-bwlch, Merioneth, and later to a former workhouse in Cors-y-Gedol Hall, near Barmouth, until the end of the war.

The school moved to its present site at Pease Pottage after World War II in 1946. The school is housed in a Grade II-listed Victorian mansion known as Buchan Hill that was built in 1882–3 by Philip Felix Renaud Saillard. The building is a large Elizabethan-style house, designed by the architects Ernest George and Harold Peto. Buchan Hill had been purchased in the early 19th century by Thomas Erskine (Lord Chancellor 1806–1807), son of the Earl of Buchan.

Notable alumni

 Gordon Chater, actor and comedian
 Robert Hanbury Brown, astronomer 
 Robin Niblett, director of Chatham House 
 Thomas Sopwith, aviation pioneer

References

External links
Official school website

Preparatory schools in West Sussex
Grade II listed buildings in West Sussex
Grade II listed houses
Ernest George buildings
Harold Peto buildings